Fernando Ortega Bernés (born February 16, 1958) is a Mexican politician  who served as the 16th Governor of Campeche from 2009 to 2015. He has previously served as a mayor and local state senator in Campeche.

Ortega Bernes was born on February 16, 1958, in the city of Campeche. He holds a bachelor's degree in political science and public administration. Ortega Bernes has taught at the Universidad Autónoma de Campeche.

See also
 List of presidents of Campeche Municipality

References

1958 births
Governors of Campeche
Living people
Institutional Revolutionary Party politicians
Politicians from Campeche City
21st-century Mexican politicians
Universidad Iberoamericana alumni
Academic staff of the Autonomous University of Campeche
Members of the Congress of Campeche
Members of the Senate of the Republic (Mexico)